Perrin may refer to:

Places in the United States
Perrin, Missouri, an unincorporated community
Perrin, Texas, an unincorporated community in southeastern Jack County, Texas

Other
Famille Perrin, French winery owners
Perrin friction factors, in hydrodynamics
Perrin number, in mathematics
Éditions Perrin, a publishing house (est. 1827)
Perrin's beaked whale, a recently described species of whale
Perrin's cave beetle, an extinct freshwater beetle from France
Towers Perrin, a global professional services firm

People

Surname
Abner Monroe Perrin (1827–1864), Confederate States Army general
Alain Perrin (born 1956), French association football coach, former manager of China national team
Ami Perrin (died 1561), Swiss opponent of Calvinism reform
Benjamin Perrin, Canadian professor
Benny Perrin (1959–2017), American football safety
Bernadette Perrin-Riou (born 1955), French number theorist
Carmen Perrin (born 1953), Bolivian-born Swiss artist and educator
Cédric Perrin (born 1974), French politician
Christopher Perrin (born 1961), American publisher, educator, and writer
Claude Victor-Perrin, duc de Belluno (1764–1841), marshal of France during the French Revolutionary and Napoleonic Wars
Conny Perrin (born 1990), Swiss tennis player
Daniel Perrin (1642–1719), one of the first permanent European inhabitants of Staten Island, New York
Don Perrin (born 1964), Canadian writer and former military officer
Edwin O. Perrin (1822–1889), New York lawyer
Elula Perrin (1929–2004), French-Vietnamese writer
Elzéar Abeille de Perrin (1843–1910), French entomologist
Émile Perrin (1814–1885), French painter, theatre director and impresario
Éric Perrin (born 1975), NHL center for the Atlanta Thrashers
Francis Perrin (actor) (born 1947), French actor, screenwriter and director
Francis Perrin (physicist) (1901–1992), French physicist
Gaëtan Perrin (born 1996), French professional footballer
Gillian Perrin (born 1950), English former badminton player
Frederick Perrin, American chess master
Harold Perrin (c. 1878–1948), British aviation pioneer
Hélène Perrin (born 1972), French physicist
Jack Perrin (1896–1967), American actor specializing in westerns
Jacques Perrin (born 1941), French actor and film maker
Jean-Baptiste Perrin (1870–1942), French physicist (Nobel prize 1926)
Jean Georges Perrin (born 1971), French IT expert and serial entrepreneur
Jim Perrin, British rock climber and travel writer
John Draper Perrin (1890–1967), Canadian mining executive and civic leader
John Gordon Perrin (born 1989), Canadian volleyball player
Joseph Perrin (1754–1800), French army general
L. Timothy Perrin, American academic
Loïc Perrin (born 1985), French association football player
Lonnie Perrin (1952–2021), American football running back
Lucas Perrin (born 1998), French professional footballer
Mark Perrin Lowrey (1828–1885), American Southern Baptist preacher
Maurice Perrin (bishop) (1904–1994), French bishop in Tunisia, diplomat
Maurice Perrin (cyclist) (1911–1992), French Olympic cyclist
Maurice Perrin (physician) (1875–1956), French physician
Nat Perrin (1905–1998), a comedy writer
Nicholas Perrin, American academic administrator and religious scholar
Noel Perrin (1927–2004), American essayist and a professor at Dartmouth College
Patricia Charlotte Perrin (1921–1988), New Zealand potter
Percy Perrin (1876-1945), English cricketer, played for Essex
Philippe Perrin (born 1963), test pilot and former CNES and European Space Agency astronaut
Pierre Perrin (1620?–1675), French poet and librettist
Henry Perrin Coon (1822–1884), American, 10th Mayor of San Francisco
Ronald Edward Perrin (1931–1997), British cathedral organist
Sam Perrin (1901–1998), American screenwriter
Stephen Perrin (born 1970) English cricketer and footballer
Steve Perrin (born 1946), American game designer and technical writer/editor
Steve Perrin (born 1952) English footballer (Crystal Palace, Plymouth Argyle and Portsmouth)
Vic Perrin (1916–1989), American actor and voice artist
William Perrin (convict) (1831–1903), convict transported to Western Australia, later becoming a school teacher
William Gordon Perrin (1874–1931), R.A.F. and Navy officer, and the Admiralty librarian 1908 to 1931, author of British Flags

Given name
Perrin Beatty (born 1950), corporate executive and former Canadian politician
Perrin Kaplan, vice president of Marketing & Corporate Affairs for Nintendo of America Inc

Fiction
Perrin (Star Trek), a fictional character in the Star Trek universe
Perrin Aybara, a main character of Robert Jordan's epic fantasy The Wheel of Time
The Fall and Rise of Reginald Perrin, a novel and British sitcom written by David Nobbs
Reggie Perrin, a remake of The Fall and Rise of Reginald Perrin broadcast in 2009

See also
Lea & Perrins, a United Kingdom food company, originating in Worcester
Perin (disambiguation)